The Lonely Man is a 1957 American Western film directed by Henry Levin and written by Harry Essex and Robert Smith. The film stars Jack Palance, Anthony Perkins, Elaine Aiken,Neville Brand, Robert Middleton, Elisha Cook, Jr., Claude Akins and Lee Van Cleef. The film was released on June 21, 1957, by Paramount Pictures.

Plot

Riley Wade hates his gunfighter father, Jacob, for deserting Riley's mother, who then committed suicide. Jacob rides to Red Bluff hoping to reconcile with his son, unaware that King Fisher holds a grudge and intends to shoot down Jacob, first chance.

Riley accompanies his father on the trail, setting their family ranch ablaze first, never letting him out of his sight. Jacob's sight, meantime, is fading; he is slowly going blind, a fact he hides from his son. Riley refuses to forgive his father until old friend Ben Ryerson explains to him that Jacob didn't desert his mother at all.

King comes to town with his men. Riley, aware for the first time of his father's failing vision, acts as his eyes in directing Jacob where to shoot. King's men die and he tries to sneak away, but he and Jacob end up in a showdown anyway and kill one another. Jacob dies in his son's arms.

Cast 
Jack Palance as Jacob Wade
Anthony Perkins as Riley Wade
Neville Brand as King Fisher
Elaine Aiken as Ada Marshall
Robert Middleton as Ben Ryerson
Elisha Cook, Jr. as Willie 
Claude Akins as Blackburn
Lee Van Cleef as Faro
Harry Shannon as Dr. Fisher
James Bell as Judge Hart
Adam Williams as Lon
Denver Pyle as Brad
John Doucette as Sundown Whipple
Paul Newlan as Fence Green 
Tennessee Ernie Ford as Singer

References

External links 
 

1957 films
Paramount Pictures films
American Western (genre) films
1957 Western (genre) films
Films directed by Henry Levin
Revisionist Western (genre) films
1950s English-language films
1950s American films